Green  toucanets are near-passerine birds from the genus Aulacorhynchus in the toucan family. They are native to Mexico, and Central and South America. All are found in humid forests and woodlands in highlands, but a few also occur in adjacent lowlands. They are typically seen in pairs or small groups, and sometimes follow mixed species flocks.

Taxonomy and systematics
A major taxonomy review in 1974 resulted in 6 species in the genus Aulacorhynchus, and this was adopted by virtually all later authorities.

In 2001, it was suggested that A. prasinus, as traditionally defined, was a species complex that should be split into 7 different species based on preliminary morphological evidence. This was to some extent supported by genetic evidence, which suggested that additional species should be recognized. As a result, A. griseigularis was split from in A. albivitta based on this early genetic evidence but these species are now lumped together again.

Currently, there remains a considerable lack of consensus to support the IOC's latest taxonomy of Aulacorhynchus into eleven species. Several authorities still maintain that the genus Aulacorhynchus has only 7 species and treat the remaining as subspecies. The SACC has called for further genetic studies of this genus.

Species
The genus Aulacorhynchus has eleven species considered to belong to the genus:

References

 
Toucans
Higher-level bird taxa restricted to the Neotropics
Taxonomy articles created by Polbot
Taxa named by John Gould